There are at least 50 named lakes and reservoirs in Sweet Grass County, Montana.

Lakes
 Armour Pond, el. 
 Beley Lakes, el. 
 Blue Lake, el. 
 Blue Lake, el. 
 Burnt Gulch Lake, el. 
 Camp Lake, el. 
 Cascade Lake, el. 
 Chalice Lake, el. 
 Cirque Lake, el. 
 Crazy Lake, el. 
 Divide Creek Lake, el. 
 Emerald Lake, el. 
 Favonius Lake, el. 
 Fish Lake, el. 
 Granite Lake, el. 
 Hidden Lake, el. 
 Horseshoe Lake, el. 
 Jay Lake, el. 
 Jordan Lake, el. 
 Kent Lake, el. 
 Lake Columbine, el. 
 Lake Kathleen, el. 
 Lake Pinchot, el. 
 Lightning Lake, el. 
 Lost Lake, el. 
 Lower Glaston Lake, el. 
 Martes Lake, el. 
 Mirror Lake, el. 
 Moccasin Lake, el. 
 Mouse Lake, el. 
 North Picket Pin Lake, el. 
 Owl Lake, el. 
 Pentad Lake, el. 
 Pipit Lake, el. 
 Rainbow Lakes, el. 
 Rein Lake, el. 
 South Picket Pin Lake, el. 
 Sundown Lake, el. 
 Sunken Rock Lake, el. 
 Swamp Lake, el. 
 Thunder Lake, el. 
 Trout Lake, el. 
 Wounded Man Lake, el.

Reservoirs
 Beley Pond, el. 
 Glass Lindsay Lakes Lower Reservoir, el. 
 Lake Adam Upper Reservoir, el. 
 Lake Adam Upper Reservoir, el. 
 Lake Adams Upper Reservoir, el. 
 Lavold Reservoir, el. 
 Upper Glaston Lake, el.

See also
 List of lakes in Montana

Notes

Bodies of water of Sweet Grass County, Montana
Sweet Grass